7317 Cabot, provisional designation , is a background asteroid in a resonance with Jupiter, located the inner regions of the asteroid belt, approximately  in diameter. It was discovered on 12 March 1940, by Hungarian astronomer György Kulin at the Konkoly Observatory in Budapest. The presumed S-type asteroid has a rotation period of 2.2 hours. It was named after Italian explorer John Cabot.

Orbit and classification 

Cabot is located in a 10:3 orbital resonance with Jupiter (10/3J), a mean-motion resonance of moderate order and a location of orbital instability. Asteroids in these resonances are known for their chaotic orbits with a relatively short Lyapunov time. It is a non-family asteroid of the main belt's background population when applying the hierarchical clustering method to its proper orbital elements. Based on osculating Keplerian orbital elements, the asteroid has also been classified as a member of the Flora family, a giant asteroid family and the largest family of stony asteroids in the main-belt.

It orbits the Sun in the inner asteroid belt at a distance of 2.0–2.7 AU once every 3 years and 7 months (1,300 days; semi-major axis of 2.33 AU). Its orbit has an eccentricity of 0.15 and an inclination of 4° with respect to the ecliptic.

Physical characteristics 

Cabot is an assumed, stony S-type asteroid.

Rotation period 

In January 2011, a fragmentary rotational lightcurve of Cabot was obtained from photometric observations in the R-band by astronomers at the Palomar Transient Factory in California. Lightcurve analysis gave a poorly defined rotation period of 2.237 hours with a brightness amplitude of 0.10 magnitude. As of 2018, no secure period has been published.

Diameter and albedo 

According to the survey carried out by the NEOWISE mission of NASA's Wide-field Infrared Survey Explorer, Cabot measures 3.66 and 5.363 kilometers in diameter and its surface has an albedo of 0.185 and 0.24, respectively. The Collaborative Asteroid Lightcurve Link assumes an albedo of 0.24 – derived from 8 Flora, the parent body of the Flora family – and calculates a diameter of 3.62 kilometers based on an absolute magnitude of 14.37.

Naming 

This minor planet was named after Italian explorer John Cabot (Giovanni Caboto; c. 1450–1499), who discovered the coast of North America in 1497, the first recorded landfall since the Norse voyages. The Venetian navigator sailed from Bristol under the commission of Henry VII of England. The official naming citation was published by the Minor Planet Center on 20 June 1997.

References

External links 
 Asteroid Lightcurve Database (LCDB), query form (info )
 Dictionary of Minor Planet Names, Google books
 Discovery Circumstances: Numbered Minor Planets (5001)-(10000) – Minor Planet Center
 
 

007317
Discoveries by György Kulin
Named minor planets
19400312